Everette Burgess Howard (September 19, 1873 – April 3, 1950) was an American politician and a U.S. Representative from Oklahoma.

Biography
Born in Morgantown, Kentucky, Howard was the son of Addison A. and Addie P. Harreld Howard. He attended the public schools, and learned the art of printing and engaged in newspaper work in Kentucky, Oklahoma, and Missouri. He married Hollis Hope in Missouri on December 4, 1895, and they had one son, Paxton.

Career
Howard moved to Tulsa, Oklahoma, in 1905 and engaged in the manufacture of brick and in the production of oil and gas. He served as a member of the State board of public affairs from 1911 to 1915, and as State auditor of Oklahoma from 1915 to 1919.

Elected as a Democrat to the Sixty-sixth Congress, as a Representative from Oklahoma, serving from March 4, 1919 to March 3, 1921. An unsuccessful candidate for reelection in 1920 to the Sixty-seventh Congress, he was elected to the Sixty-eighth Congress. and served from March 4, 1923 to March 3, 1925. Not a candidate for renomination in 1924, he was an unsuccessful candidate for the Democratic nomination for United States Senator. He was then elected to the Seventieth Congress as Representative and served from March 4, 1927 to March 3, 1929. He was an unsuccessful candidate for reelection in 1928 to the Seventy-first Congress.

Returning to his private business, Howard engaged in the production of oil and gas in Oklahoma and Texas.

Death
Howard died in Midland, Texas, on April 3, 1950. He is interred at Memorial Park, Oklahoma City, Oklahoma.

References

External links

Encyclopedia of Oklahoma History and Culture - Howard, Everette 

1873 births
1950 deaths
Democratic Party members of the United States House of Representatives from Oklahoma
People from Morgantown, Kentucky